The Botanical Garden of the Ozarks is a not for profit 501(c)3 organization located on the east side of Lake Fayetteville in Fayetteville, Arkansas, United States. The 44-acre (16 ha) site is located at the border between Fayetteville and Springdale on Arkansas Highway 265 (Crossover Road). The garden consists of 6 cultivated acres (2.4 ha) featuring 12 display gardens and the state's only Butterfly House where four seasons of flora and fauna thrive.  The BGO is a member-supported garden dedicated to education and environmental awareness.  The garden is also a community destination for celebrations and unique nature experiences.  The garden offers events throughout the year, including the annual Greening of the Garden Gala, Firefly Fling and Chefs in the Garden.  Additionally, the garden hosts students from across the region for interactive field trips and offers educational programs and classes for both children and adults.

Garden description
The Botanical Garden of the Ozarks was incorporated in 1994 and opened to the public in 2007. The first phase of development was to complete the nine "Backyard Gardens". The initial gardens included a Japanese Garden, the Vegetable and Herb Garden, the Children's Garden, the Four Seasons Garden, the Shade Garden, the Rose and Perennial Garden, the Ozark Native Garden, the Sensory Garden and the Rock and Water Garden.  The Founder's Garden, the Reading Railroad, the Education Cottage Garden and the Butterfly House and Garden has been added since the gardens were officially opened in 2007.

External links 
 Botanical Garden Website

Botanical gardens in Arkansas
Protected areas of Washington County, Arkansas
Tourist attractions in Fayetteville, Arkansas